Salvatore Biasco (31 December 1939 – 6 September 2022) was an Italian economist and politician. A member of the Democratic Party of the Left, he served in the Chamber of Deputies from 1996 to 2001.

Biasco died on 6 September 2022, at the age of 82.

References

1939 births
2022 deaths
Deputies of Legislature XIII of Italy
Democratic Party of the Left politicians
Democrats of the Left politicians
Politicians from Rome
Italian economists
Alumni of Trinity College, Cambridge